Wayne Center may refer to:

Wayne Center, Indiana
Wayne Center, New York